Sŏngmak station is a railway station in Sŏngmang-rodongjagu, Puryŏng county, North Hamgyŏng, North Korea, on the Hambuk Line of the Korean State Railway.

It was opened on 5 November 1916 together with the rest of the Ch'ŏngjin–Ch'angp'yŏng section of the former Hamgyŏng Line.

References

Railway stations in North Korea